Albert Henry Outen (6 December 1902 – 21 July 1972) was an Australian rules footballer who played with Footscray in the Victorian Football Association (VFA) and Victorian Football League (VFL) during the 1920s.

Family
The youngest of the six children of Charles George Outen (1856-1929), and Bridget Outen, née Cross, Albert Henry Outen was born at Williamstown, Victoria on 6 December 1902.
 His brother, Charles Whynam "Wyn" Outen (1880-1964), played for St Klda in the VFL and for Williamstown in the VFA; Wyn played (alongside his brother Matt) in the Willamstown First XVIII team that won the 1907 VFA premiership.
 His brother, William Matthew "Matt" Outen (1883-1930), also played for St Kilda in the VFL and Williamstown in the VFA.
 His brother, John Edward "Jack" Outen (1890-1963), played in one First XVIII game for Williamstown (alongside his brother Matt) in 1909.
 His brother, Percy Ernest Hatherley Outen (1898-1986), played in 5 First XVIII games for Williamstown in the VFA in 1928.<ref>P.E. Outen in The VFA Project'.</ref>
 His nephew, Reginald Whynam Outen (1913-1999),Back in the Four, The Williamstown Chronicle, (Saturday, 12 August 1939), p.6. the son of Wyn Outen, was an emergency in Williamstown's 1939 premiership team, after earlier playing with Collingwood and Melbourne Seconds.
 His son, Albert Keith "Alby" Outen (1936-2010), played 2 games with Footscray in 1954 before transferring to Williamstown and playing in their 1955 and 1956 premiership teams.

He married Eva Grace Brown (1903-1996) in 1927.

Football
Outen first played for Footscray in 1922 and soon established himself in defence. In 1928 he won their best and fairest award.

See also
 1927 Melbourne Carnival

Notes

References
 'Kickeroo', "Football Topics of the Moment: Surprise at Footscray: Outen Applies for Clearance", The Herald, (Tuesday, 14 May 1929), p.3.
 Sunshine Make Progress: Keen Local Interest in Football, The Sporting Globe, (Saturday, 9 August 1930), p.5.
 A. Outen Injured, The Sporting Globe, (Saturday, 17 September 1932), p.2.

External links
 
 Albert H. "Alby" Outen at The VFA Project''.

1902 births
Australian rules footballers from Melbourne
Footscray Football Club (VFA) players
Western Bulldogs players
Charles Sutton Medal winners
1972 deaths
People from Williamstown, Victoria